Verity Crawley (born July 19, 1994), is an English professional bowler who competes on the Professional Women's Bowling Association (PWBA) Tour in the United States. She moved from England to the US in 2012 to join the bowling program at Webber International University in Babson Park, Florida. In 2017, she began competing professionally on the PWBA Tour.

Crawley is sponsored by Storm Bowling, CoolWick sportswear, VISE grips, BowlerX.com, and Kegel Training Center.

Career
In 2012, Crawley won a gold medal in the European Youth Championship. She was also named Junior Bowler of the Year by the British Tenpin Bowling Association (BTBA).

During her time at Webber International University, Crawley won the NAIA (National Association of Intercollegiate Athletics) National Championship. She also took two first-place finishes in the Tenpin Team Challenge and YAC Lincoln Singles. 

In 2016, Crawley's team won the USBC Intercollegiate Team Championship.

In 2017, Crawley began competing on the PWBA Tour. She finished second to Kelly Kulick in the Fountain Valley Open and second in the Greater Detroit Open, falling to her former college teammate Daria Pajak.

The following year, Crawley had three perfect games on the PWBA Tour.  In 2019, Crawley defeated Maria Jose Rodriguez and Bryanna Cote, but fell seven pins short to O'Keefe.

In the 2021 PWBA season, Crawley finally broke through with her first title, winning the PWBA Greater Nashville Open by topping Daria Pajak in the title match on June 12. She finished the 2021 season tied for most championship round appearances (6) and third in Player of the Year points.

In 2022, Crawley was named 2022 Female Bowler of the Year.

References

1994 births
Living people
British ten-pin bowling players